Barinas may refer to:

Places
Spain
 Barinas (Spain)

Venezuela
 Barinas (state), one of the 23 states which make up the country
 Barinas, Barinas, a city in the state of Barinas
 Roman Catholic Diocese of Barinas
 Barinas Municipality, a municipio in the state of Barinas
 Barinas Province, a former province, in existence from 1786 to 1864

Other uses
 Barinas (harvestman), a genus of the Agoristenidae family of harvestmen

See also
 Holden Barina, an automobile